The Tatra T.101 is a two-seat monoplane general aviation aircraft that was built in 1937 by Tatra. Only one aircraft was built, but it set several records in the hands of Jan Ambruš. In 2008 a replica aircraft was constructed by brothers Ivo and Jiří Sklenář. It first flew in October 2009.

Design and development
Tatra started making aircraft in 1935, building the Avro 626 Avian and Bücker Bü 131 Jungmann under licence. In 1937 the Tatra T.001 was the first aircraft designed and built by Tatra. The T.101 was a development of that aircraft, with an increased wingspan and a larger empennage than the T.001.

Only one aircraft was built by Tatra, msn 01. It was registered OK-TAO.

Operational history
The Tatra T.101 gained a number of records. In 1937 a prize was offered for the longest flight by an aircraft of Czechoslovakian origin.

Replica
After the Velvet Revolution of 1989, citizens in the Czech Republic and Slovakia gained new freedom. The celebration of heritage had been suppressed under communism and the restoration of historic aircraft was forbidden by the Communist authorities. Since the revolution, interest in heritage has grown, and a number of attempts to revive industrial heritage, including aviation heritage, have been successful.

One of these projects was the re-creation of the Tatra T.101 by twins Ivo and Jiří Sklenář. In the early 2000s they started researching the aircraft and discovered that the blueprints had escaped destruction. They were discovered in the state archive at Opava. A Tatra HM-504 and a Tatra T100 engine were acquired with the assistance of Tatra and the Czech . These two engines were rebuilt and made into an airworthy T100 engine with the assistance of Tatra and the Czech National Technical Museum.

The process was hampered by the non-availability of spare parts, particularly cylinder valves. A new two-bladed wooden propeller was one of the first items made for the aircraft. The replica used some modern manufacturing methods and materials, such as TIG welding, carbon composites and fibreglass. Deviations from the original design were made only where required by modern aeronautical regulations. The aircraft has modern avionics and a strobe light.

The  span wooden wings are a one-piece unit. They were built by Jan Tobek, an ultralight aircraft maker. The wing is the largest wooden wing built in the Czech Republic since the end of World War II. The aircraft was assembled at Kunovice Airport in a hangar owned by Evektor-Aerotechnik and Let Kunovice. The aircraft was completed on 29 September 2008. After ground testing, a series of flight tests was begun in October 2009, resulting in the issue of a Certificate of Airworthiness on 1 December 2009. The replica aircraft was given msn 02.

Specifications

See also
Tatra T.001, which the T.101 was developed from.
Tatra T.201, which was developed from the T.101
Zlin 26, which was developed from the T.201

References

External links

Images of various Tatra designed aircraft

Aircraft manufactured in the Czech Republic and Czechoslovakia
Tatra vehicles
Low-wing aircraft
Single-engined tractor aircraft